An album by Elephant Micah, released after a long delay in December, 2006 on Time-Lag Records. Demos were circulating the internet as Elephant Micah and the Hindu Windmills. For unknown reasons, the album, originally due out in the spring, had been repeatedly delayed by the label. The vinyl version was released nine months before the CD due to long delay by the record company..

One song, "Devil With A Wooden Face", was posted on multiple blogs on June 6, 2006. Many of the songs can be found on the live shows available for download at the Hoosier Handheld website.

Track listing
"Human Groove"
"Untitled (Distant Things)"
"Devil With A Wooden Face"
"Burned Senses"
"Circular"
"Pleasure Trip"
"Saint Lucy"
"Privacy"

Elephant Micah albums
2006 albums